The Junior Eurovision Song Contest 2005 was the third edition of the annual Junior Eurovision Song Contest for young singers aged 8 to 15. On 26 November 2005, the contest was broadcast live from the Ethias Arena in Hasselt, Belgium, in a joint effort by the national broadcasters Vlaamse Radio- en Televisieomroep (VRT) and Radio télévision belge de la communauté française (RTBF), in co-operation with the European Broadcasting Union. Marcel Vanthilt and Maureen Louys hosted the event.

The show was not only broadcast live in the competing countries, it was also available on satellite worldwide and the Australian television channel SBS who acquired the rights to broadcast the show one month later. The theme of the show was Let's Get Loud, standing for the new generation on the stage. The show was watched by 8,500 people in the arena, including the Belgian Prince Laurent and 20–25 million people around Europe.

 was the winner of this edition, with 10-year-old Ksenia Sitnik singing her song "My vmeste". Last year's winner  finished in second place, with 2004 hosts  coming third.

Location

Bidding phase and host selection
Following the hosting problems for the 2004 edition, the location of the subsequent contests were appointed by the European Broadcasting Union (EBU), following a bidding process with broadcasters from the participating countries. Belgium was therefore the first country to successfully bid for the rights to host the contest in 2005.

In November 2003, there were reports that the competition was to take place in the Netherlands. In the same month, Jeroen Depraetere, coordinator of the show on behalf of the EBU, announced that five countries had expressed their willingness to organise the competition. Belgium won the right to hold the contest in March 2004 over five other countries including Croatian Radiotelevision (HRT) of Croatia and AVRO of the Netherlands.

In November 2004, it was announced that the Flemish city of Hasselt would host the contest at the Ethias Arena. The date of the contest had been confirmed shortly after the  contest in Lillehammer.

Venue

The Ethias Arena is the largest multi-purpose arena in Hasselt, Belgium which is used for music concerts, sports (tennis, indoor cycling, jumping, etc.) and other large events. The arena opened in September 2004 and holds up to 21,600 people depending on the event. The venue is a part of the Grenslandhallen and has a surface of 13,600 square meters (44,619 square feet). In 2015, it hosted the 2015 European Championship in darts, a Professional Darts Corporation event. The venue would later be renamed to Trixxo Arena.

Format

Presenters
On 13 October 2005, it was revealed during a presentation that Maureen Louys of RTBF and Marcel Vanthilt of VRT would be the hosts of the contest.

Running order
The selection of the running order was conducted in two phases. In the first, which took place at the City Hall of Hasselt, there were three draws: one to select the countries that would perform first and last in the contest; a second to decide on the position of the host country; and a third to divided the 14 remaining countries into two groups of five (for the positions 2–6 and 7–11) and one of three (for the positions 13–15).

The second phase of the selection of the running order was conducted by the JESC Steering Group. The group decided on the final positions of the countries within the three groups, taking into account, for example, that no three ballads or no three songs from one European region should be performed consecutively in the contest. This system was already applied last year for the festival in Lillehammer.

Voting
Voting was the same as the traditional voting system, with each country voting for their 10 favorite songs, with scores of 1–8, 10 and 12. It was the first time points 1 through 5 had automatically appeared on the scoreboard, with spokesmen reporting only points 6, 7, 8, 10 and 12. The presenters started off by giving all contestants 12 points.

Opening and interval acts
The show opened with fireworks and bungee jumpers. Vladik Myagkostupov from Cirque du Soleil gave a four-minute performance during the interval. During the counting of votes, the 2004 winner, María Isabel from Spain, sang a medley of her winning entry "Antes muerta que sencilla" and new single "Pues Va A Ser Que No" from her second album Número 2. She also presented the prize to the winner of the competition.

Participating countries
Initially, 17 countries planned to participate, but on 13 October, Cypriot broadcaster CyBC announced that it was withdrawing for internal reasons - allegations of plagiarism regarding the selected song had been made. However, Cypriot viewers were able to watch the show and vote.

Participants and results

Detailed voting results 

Despite withdrawing at a late stage, Cyprus was still permitted to vote in the contest.

When the British spokesperson based in the ITV2 studios in London, Vicky Gordon was about to give the UK televoting results, the scoreboard malfunctioned by showing all the scores compressed together, before the entire screen went black, only showing the EBU, VRT and RTBF logos, which meant that the computers had lost connection with the British broadcaster, although the spokesperson could still be heard. However, the results were announced as usual shortly afterwards.

12 points
Below is a summary of all 12 points received. All countries were given 12 points at the start of voting to ensure that no country finished with nul points.

Spokespersons 

 Stella Maria Koukkidi
 Yorgos Kotsougiannis
 Caroline Forsberg Thybo
 Nika Turković
 Beatrice Soare
 Vicky Gordon 
 Halahen Zajden
 Roman Kerimov
 Vase Dokovski
 Giovanni Kemper
 Jovana Vukčević
 Kristiana Stirane
 Max Colombie
 Stephanie Bason
 Karoline Wendelborg 
 Gonzalo Gutierrez Blanco
 Anton Lediaev

Other countries
For a country to be eligible for potential participation in the Junior Eurovision Song Contest, it needs to be an active member of the EBU. The following active EBU members did not take part:

 Cyprus was originally going to participate in the 2005 contest, represented by Rena Kiriakidi's "Tsirko". However, it was later claimed to be plagiarised, and Cyprus Broadcasting Corporation (CyBC), the national broadcaster, was forced to withdraw. However, they did not lose their broadcast and voting rights and still broadcast the show live.
 France, one of two debutants at the previous contest, and broadcaster France 3 turned down the offer to participate due to the following reasons:
 Programming difficulties and restructuring within the channel
 Very low viewing figures the previous year
 No motivation to compete, with French Head of Delegation Bruno Berberes stating that "Too much Eurovision kills Eurovision"
 Georgia was one of the countries on the preliminary participation list for the 2005 contest. However, at the time, Georgian Public Broadcasting (GPB) was not a full member of the EBU and would become a member on the 6th of July, but as this was one week after the participation confirmation deadline, meaning Georgia had to withdraw and to wait out their participation until 2007.
 Just like the 2004 contest, Raidió Teilifís Éireann (RTÉ) was said to be debuting at the 2005 contest. However, no official statement was released by the broadcaster and they ended up not participating.
 Lithuania, like Georgia, was one of the countries on the preliminary list for 2005. But, Lithuania withdrew for unspecified reasons. They would debut in 2007.
 Monaco and Monegasque broadcaster TMC expressed an interest in participating. However, plans never came to fruition due to scheduling problems and harsh citizenship laws and thus they never participated.
 Despite signing a 3-year contract with the EBU, Polish broadcaster Telewizja Polska (TVP) announced they would withdraw due to lack of interest and poor results. They would eventually return in 2016.
 Even though Portugal did not participate, public broadcaster Rádio e Televisão de Portugal (RTP) broadcast the contest delayed and confirmed they would debut in 2006.
 Switzerland, one of two debutants in 2004, and the Swiss-Italian broadcaster RTSI turned down the offer to participate for the following reasons:
 Financial difficulties
 Lack of interest and financial support from the other multilingual broadcasters of Swiss Broadcasting Corporation (SRG SSR)
 Ukraine, like Lithuania, was on the preliminary list of participation for 2005. But, they pulled out before the night and had to wait until the next year to debut.

Broadcasts

Official album

Junior Eurovision Song Contest - 05, is a compilation album put together by the European Broadcasting Union, and was released by Universal Music Group in November 2005. The album features all the songs from the 2005

See also
 Eurovision Song Contest 2005
 Eurovision Young Dancers 2005

Notes and references

Notes

References

External links

 
2005
2005 song contests
2005 in Belgium
Eurovision Song Contest 2005
Music events in Belgium
November 2005 events in Europe
Hasselt
Historical events in Belgium